Leena Günther (born 16 April 1991 in Cologne) is a German athlete who competes in the sprint with a personal best time of 11.33 seconds in the 100 metres event.

Günther won the gold medal at the 2012 European Athletics Championships – Women's 4 × 100 metres relay in Helsinki.  That year, she was also part of the German 4 x 100 m women's team which finished 5th in the final at the Olympic Games.  She has also competed at the 2010 World Junior Championships in Athletics.

References

External links 

 documentary film about Leena Günther on her way to London
 

1991 births
Living people
Athletes from Cologne
German female sprinters
Athletes (track and field) at the 2012 Summer Olympics
Olympic athletes of Germany
European Athletics Championships medalists
Olympic female sprinters